Stigmella ilsea is a moth of the family Nepticulidae. It is found in New Zealand.

The length of the forewings is about 2 mm. Adults have been recorded in January, October and November. Reared specimens emerged from July to September. There is probably one generation per year.

The larvae feed on Olearia virgata, Olearia rugosa, Olearia odorata, Olearia laxiflora, Olearia lineate and Olearia hectorii. They mine the leaves of their host plant. The mine starts as very narrow gallery, but a full-grown larva occupies all space between the cuticles, leaving nothing but a small, empty bladder. Larva have been recorded from February to May and in July and September. They are 2–3 mm long and pale yellow.

The cocoon is pale brown and spun in detritus on the ground.

References

External links
Fauna of New Zealand - Number 16: Nepticulidae (Insecta: Lepidoptera)

Nepticulidae
Moths of New Zealand
Endemic fauna of New Zealand
Moths described in 1989
Endemic moths of New Zealand